Euphaedra extensa, the pale striped forester, is a butterfly in the family Nymphalidae. It is found in eastern Nigeria, Cameroon and Bioko. Its habitat consists of forests.

References

Butterflies described in 1981
extensa